Hector Lachlan Stewart MacLean, VC (13 September 1870 – 17 August 1897) was a Scottish recipient of the Victoria Cross, the highest and most prestigious award for gallantry in the face of the enemy that can be awarded to British and Commonwealth forces.

Details
Hector MacLean was the eldest son of Margaret MacQueen (née Bairnsfather; 1846–1921) and Major-General Charles Smith MacLean CB CIE (1836–1921). Hector was born in a tent on the hill of Sheikh Budin, in the Northwestern Provinces of India, now Pakistan. He was educated at Fettes College in Edinburgh. He was 26 years old, and a lieutenant in the Indian Staff Corps and Corps of Guides, Indian Army during the Tirah Campaign when the following deed took place for which he was posthumously awarded the VC.

On 17 August 1897 at Nawa Kili, Upper Swat, British India, Lieutenant Maclean, with fellow officers Robert Bellew Adams and Alexander Edward Murray, Viscount Fincastle and five men of the Guides, went under a heavy and close fire, to the rescue of a Lieutenant Greaves of the Lancashire Fusiliers who was lying disabled by a bullet wound and surrounded by enemy swordsmen. While the wounded officer was being brought under cover he was killed by a bullet. Lieutenant Maclean was mortally wounded. His citation read:

Bruce Bairnsfather was his maternal cousin.

His nephew, Vice Admiral Sir Hector Charles Donald Maclean, was the maternal grandfather of actor Rupert Everett.

The medal
His VC is on display in the Lord Ashcroft Gallery at the Imperial War Museum, London.

References

Monuments to Courage (David Harvey, 1999)
The Register of the Victoria Cross (This England, 1997)
Scotland's Forgotten Valour (Graham Ross, 1995)

1870 births
1897 deaths
British recipients of the Victoria Cross
British military personnel of the Tirah campaign
People educated at Fettes College
British Indian Army personnel killed in action
Corps of Guides (India) officers
Indian Staff Corps officers
British military personnel of the Chitral Expedition
British military personnel of the Malakand Frontier War
People from Dera Ismail Khan District
Graduates of the Royal Military College, Sandhurst
Royal Northumberland Fusiliers officers